is a Japanese former figure skater who competed in pairs and ladies' singles. She skated in partnership with Yamato Tamura before teaming up with Shin Amano. Arai and Amano placed 20th at the 1998 Winter Olympics in Nagano. They are the 1998 Japanese national champions.

Arai's best national result as a single skater, tenth, came at the 2001–02 Japan Championships. After retiring from competition, she became a skating coach.

Results 
GP: Champions Series (Grand Prix)

Ladies' singles

Pairs with Amano

Pairs with Tamura

References 

1981 births
Living people
Japanese female pair skaters
Olympic figure skaters of Japan
Figure skaters at the 1998 Winter Olympics